Gubostovo is a rural locality (a selo) in Pochepsky District, Bryansk Oblast, Russia. The population was 33 as of 2013. There is 1 street.

Geography 
Gubostovo is located 25 km southwest of Pochep (the district's administrative centre) by road. Pervomaysky is the nearest rural locality.

References 

Rural localities in Pochepsky District